Baron Charles-Henri van de Werve (1672-1721), Lord of Schilde, Lord of Giessen-Oudkerk, Lord of Wavre-Notre-Dame and Lord of Wavrans, formed part of a very old, important and noble family of Antwerp, House van de Werve.

Family 

He was the son of Charles I Bruno van de Werve, Lord of Schilde; and of Cornélie van de Werve, daughter of the Lord of Westkercke. Through his grandmother side he is one of the descendants of Erasmus II Schetz. He married Eléonore de Varick in 1696. Eléonore was the daughter of Charles-Hyacinthe de Varick, Lord of Court St-Etienne and of Witterzée; and of Eléonore-Louise de Haynin, Lady of Wavrans.

They had 4 children's:
 Eléonore-Marie van de Werve (1698–1726).
 X1(1716): She married Charles-François Boot, Lord of Veltem, Oppem, Sombeke and La Motte. 
 X2(1724): She married Ferdinand-Joseph, marquess de la Puente y Reiffenberg, baron of Limal, Lord of Bierges.
 Gertrude-Madeleine van de Werve (1700–1746): She married in 1725 her cousin Philippe-Adrien de Varick, viscount of Brussels, baron of Woluwe-Saint-Lambert and of Libersart, Lord of Boendaal, Ixelles, Huizingen and Eizingen. 
 Baron Charles-Philippe van de Werve (1702–1744), Lord of Schilde, Giessen-Oudkerk and Wavre-Notre-Dame. 
 Charles III Philippe van de Werve, 1st Count of Vorsselaer (1706–1776): baron of Lichtaert and of Rielen, Lord of Giessen-Oudkerk. He married Marie-Anne de Pret, Lady of Vorsselaer, Lichtaert and Rielen.

Ancestry

External links
 https://web.archive.org/web/20070312045421/http://vandewerve.skyblog.com/

1672 births
1721 deaths
Charles-Henri
Charles-Henri
Charles-Henri
Charles-Henri
Charles-Henri
Mayors of Antwerp, Belgium